Harriet Mitchell Murphy is the first African-American woman appointed to a regular judgeship in Texas.

Born in Atlanta, Georgia.  Murphy received her bachelor's degree from Spelman College, master's degree from Clark Atlanta University, and law degree from the University of Texas School of Law.

In 1973, she became the first African-American woman appointed to a regular judgeship in Texas, and served on the City of Austin Municipal Court for twenty years. Before joining the municipal court, she practiced law part-time for eight years and served as the head of the government department at Huston–Tillotson in Austin for five years.

See also
List of African-American jurists
List of first women lawyers and judges in Texas

References

Year of birth missing (living people)
Living people
University of Texas School of Law alumni
Spelman College alumni
Clark Atlanta University alumni
African-American judges
Municipal judges in the United States
20th-century American judges
20th-century American women judges